Imay Hendra (born 30 January 1970) is a former Indonesian badminton player, and later represented Brunei after became Brunei national coach. He won a men's doubles bronze medal at the 1991 IBF World Championships in Copenhagen with Bagus Setiadi. They won the Finnish Open together in 1990, also finished as semi-finalists at the All England and Indonesia Open in 1991. He was part of Indonesia winning team at the 1993 Asian Championships.

Achievements

World Championships 
Men's doubles

World Junior Championships 
The Bimantara World Junior Championships was an international invitation badminton tournament for junior players. It was held in Jakarta, Indonesia from 1987 to 1991.

Boys' doubles

IBF World Grand Prix (1 title, 2 runners-up) 
The World Badminton Grand Prix sanctioned by International Badminton Federation (IBF) since 1983.

Men's doubles

IBF International (2 titles, 2 runners-up) 
Men's singles

Men's doubles

References

Bibliography

External links 
 
 

1970 births
Living people
Indonesian male badminton players
Bruneian male badminton players
Bruneian people of Indonesian descent